Suzanne Clarke McDonough (born 1933) is an American journalist, documentary filmmaker and anti-drug activist, and the founder of Project Straight Dope, the nation's first anti-drug abuse project. A graduate of the Medill School of Journalism (BSJ56), McDonough is currently working as a consultant to the World Monuments Fund's documentary on the Qianlong Emperor's private refuge in the Forbidden City.

McDonough is featured in the fall 2007 issue of Medill magazine:

 When Opportunity Knocks... 

For this alumna, Medill was the gateway to a diverse and satisfying career

Suzanne Clarke McDonough’s (BSJ56) Medill education did not decide the course of her career—not in the typical way.  Instead, it ignited the opportunity for rich and varied work in the areas of journalism, filmmaking, anti-drug advocacy, and more.   Her diverse accomplishments may have fanned out in the space of fifty years, but for McDonough, their connecting thread is easy to pinpoint.  “One project segued into another, but it all started with Medill,” she says.

As a Northwestern student, McDonough worked her way through school as advertising director of the student magazine and newspaper, and took a job after graduation as PR and advertising director at a Chicago film company.  In 1958, she leapt at the chance to become a society reporter for the Chicago Daily News, a job that paid a fraction of her previous salary, but one that rapidly led to feature-writing opportunities (“writing about everything from hula hoops to the mob”) at the paper under acclaimed editor Roy Fisher.

“Taking the spot enabled me to get my foot in the door in the exciting and prestigious world of Chicago print journalism,” says McDonough.  “It was worth it, and I loved every minute of it!”

In the mid-sixties McDonough crossed over to broadcast work, becoming producer and interviewer for a half-hour prime-time series on PBS WTTW-TV Chicago that received nationwide circulation.  An assignment that tackled drug abuse among teens cultivated a personal passion for the subject—and she went on to found Project Straight Dope, a venture that “cleaned up the airwaves and created the first responsibly produced anti-drug abuse ads aimed at teens and younger.”  Another assignment—an interview with prominent Mexican architect Luis Barragán—launched a similarly life-changing project: 10 years spent working with Barragán building the Cuernavaca Racquet Club, a private club/resort hotel with villas  in Mexico.

McDonough worked with the World Monuments Fund to produce a documentary film.

“To me, my life has had or has been a sequence of opportunity; didn’t our professors and parents always say, ‘if you are prepared, the opportunities come’?” says McDonough.  “You come out of Medill with a kit of curiosity and a sense of adventure—it has certainly been a springboard to an interesting path.”

McDonough resides in Palm Beach, Florida and is currently compiling a memoir.

-Katherine Nugent

External links 
 Medill School of Journalism
 World Monument Fund

American activists
Medill School of Journalism alumni
Living people
1933 births